Hundhammerfjellet Wind Farm is a wind farm located in Nærøysund, Norway. The farm is owned by Nord-Trøndelag Elektrisitetsverk and has been completed in December 2009 with the installation of the ENERCON E-70 2.3 MW.

References

External links

Wind farms in Norway
Nord-Trøndelag Elektrisitetsverk
Nærøysund
2009 establishments in Norway